Róbert Varga (born 25 November 1986) is a Hungarian footballer who plays for Kecskeméti TE.

References

External links
Player Profile at HLSZ 

1986 births
Living people
Sportspeople from Győr
Hungarian footballers
Association football defenders
Győri ETO FC players
Zalaegerszegi TE players
Fehérvár FC players
Kecskeméti TE players
Debreceni VSC players
Nemzeti Bajnokság I players